Calanda is a town in the province of Teruel, Aragon, Spain. It lies on the southern fringe of the Ebro river basin, at the confluence of the Rivers Guadalope and Guadalopillo.

The climate is transitional between Mediterranean and Continental.

The local economy is based upon agriculture, especially the cultivation of peaches and olives, both of which have Protected Designation of Origin status: Melocotón de Calanda in the case of the peach production and Aceite del Bajo Aragón for the olive oil. Other agricultural products are almonds and other fruits as well as some cereals.

Historic structures
 Acueducto de Los Arcos 
 Ermita del Humilladero (16th century)
 Templo del Pilar (17th century)
 Iglesia de Nuestra Señora de la Esperanza (17th century)
 Convento del Desierto (17th century)
 Casa Fortón-Cascajares (18th century)
 Casa Buñuel (20th century)

Notable natives and residents

Demographics

See also
 Miracle of Calanda

Sister cities
  Frouzins, France

Bibliography
 Allanegui y Lusarreta, Vicente: Apuntes históricos sobre la Historia de Calanda, 1998, Zaragoza: Ayuntamiento de Calanda-Parroquia de la Esperanza de Calanda-Instituto de Estudios Turolenses.
 García Miralles, Manuel: Historia de Calanda, 1969, Valencia: Tipografía Artística Puertes.

Filmography
1966: Calanda. France. Dir.: Juan Luis Buñuel. Black and White. 21 min.

Gallery

Archaeology: Camino de la Vega de Albalate 
 Roman villa of Camino de Albalate

References

External links

 Calanda
 CBC Calanda

Municipalities in the Province of Teruel